Glyphipterix morangella is a species of sedge moth in the genus Glyphipterix. It is found in New Zealand.

References

Moths described in 1875
Glyphipterigidae
Moths of New Zealand